The Allegheny Railroad  was an American railroad company operating in northwestern Pennsylvania.

The Allegheny Railroad began operations on September 3, 1985. It operated  of line between milepost 2.8 located at Erie, Pennsylvania and milepost 149.9 located at Emporium, Pennsylvania.

To create the new railroad, five individual segments were assembled: The first, from 
Erie to Irvine was purchased from Conrail.  The second, from Irvine to Warren from the
Irvine, Warren, Kane & Johnsonburg Railroad. The third, from Warren to 
Kane from the Pennsylvania Department of Transportation. The fourth, from Kane to Johnsonburg, from the Irvine, Warren, Kane & Johnsonburg Railroad. The fifth and final segment, from Johnsonburg to Emporium, was purchased from Conrail.
 
Hammermill Paper was the sole owner. Hammermill used the line to ship product between its plants in Erie and Lock Haven. Hammermill was purchased
by International Paper in 1986.

The Allegheny and Eastern Railroad, a subsidiary of Genesee & Wyoming Inc., purchased the railroad on October 31, 1992. The Allegheny and Eastern Railroad was merged into the Buffalo and Pittsburgh Railroad another subsidiary of Genesee & Wyoming Inc. on January 1, 2004.

Locomotive roster

Mileage

Main line

North Warren Branch

Refinery Branch

Grandview Branch

References

 
 
 
 Allegheny Railroad, Timetable Number 1; April 27, 1986

Transportation in Cameron County, Pennsylvania
Defunct Pennsylvania railroads
Transportation in Erie County, Pennsylvania
Transportation in Warren County, Pennsylvania
Railway companies established in 1985
Railway companies disestablished in 1992
1985 establishments in Pennsylvania
1992 disestablishments in Pennsylvania